In mathematics, an infinite series of numbers is said to converge absolutely (or to be absolutely convergent) if the sum of the absolute values of the summands is finite.  More precisely, a real or complex series  is said to converge absolutely if  for some real number  Similarly, an improper integral of a function,  is said to converge absolutely if the integral of the absolute value of the integrand is finite—that is, if 

Absolute convergence is important for the study of infinite series because its definition is strong enough to have properties of finite sums that not all convergent series possess - a convergent series that is not absolutely convergent is called conditionally convergent, while absolutely convergent series behave "nicely".  For instance, rearrangements do not change the value of the sum.  This is not true for conditionally convergent series: The alternating harmonic series  converges to  while its rearrangement  (in which the repeating pattern of signs is two positive terms followed by one negative term) converges to

Background

In finite sums, the order in which terms are added does not matter. 1 + 2 + 3 is the same as 3 + 2 + 1. However, this is not true when adding infinitely many numbers, and wrongly assuming that it is true can lead to apparent paradoxes. One classic example is the alternating sum

whose terms alternate between +1 and -1. What is the value of S? One way to evaluate S is to group the first and second term, the third and fourth, and so on:

But another way to evaluate S is to leave the first term alone and group the second and third term, then the fourth and fifth term, and so on:

This leads to an apparent paradox: does  or  ? 

The answer is that because S is not absolutely convergent, rearranging its terms changes the value of the sum. In fact, the series   does not converge, so S does not have a value to find in the first place. A series that is absolutely convergent does not have this problem: rearranging its terms does not change the value of the sum.

Definition for real and complex numbers 
A sum of real numbers or complex numbers  is absolutely convergent if the sum of the absolute values of the terms  converges.

Sums of more general elements 

The same definition can be used for series  whose terms  are not numbers but rather elements of an arbitrary abelian topological group. In that case, instead of using the absolute value, the definition requires the group to have a norm, which is a positive real-valued function  on an abelian group  (written additively, with identity element 0) such that:
 For every   implies 
 For every  
 For every  

In this case, the function  induces the structure of a metric space (a type of topology) on  

Then, a -valued series is absolutely convergent if 

In particular, these statements apply using the norm  (absolute value) in the space of real numbers or complex numbers.

In topological vector spaces 

 for every continuous seminorm  on  the family  is summable in 
If  is a normable space and if  is an absolutely summable family in  then necessarily all but a countable collection of 's are 0.

Absolutely summable families play an important role in the theory of nuclear spaces.

Relation to convergence

If  is complete with respect to the metric  then every absolutely convergent series is convergent.  The proof is the same as for complex-valued series: use the completeness to derive the Cauchy criterion for convergence—a series is convergent if and only if its tails can be made arbitrarily small in norm—and apply the triangle inequality.

In particular, for series with values in any Banach space, absolute convergence implies convergence. The converse is also true: if absolute convergence implies convergence in a normed space, then the space is a Banach space.

If a series is convergent but not absolutely convergent, it is called conditionally convergent. An example of a conditionally convergent series is the alternating harmonic series. Many standard tests for divergence and convergence, most notably including the ratio test and the root test, demonstrate absolute convergence. This is because a power series is absolutely convergent on the interior of its disk of convergence.

Proof that any absolutely convergent series of complex numbers is convergent

Suppose that  is convergent. Then equivalently,  is convergent, which implies that  and  converge by termwise comparison of non-negative terms.

The preceding discussion shows that we need only prove that convergence of  implies the convergence of 

Let  be convergent.  Since  we have

Since  is convergent,  is a bounded monotonic sequence of partial sums, and  must also converge. Noting that  is the difference of convergent series, we conclude that it too is a convergent series, as desired.

Alternative proof using the Cauchy criterion and triangle inequality 

By applying the Cauchy criterion for the convergence of a complex series, we can also prove this fact as a simple implication of the triangle inequality.  By the Cauchy criterion,  converges if and only if for any  there exists  such that  for any  But the triangle inequality implies that  so that  for any  which is exactly the Cauchy criterion for

Proof that any absolutely convergent series in a Banach space is convergent

The above result can be easily generalized to every Banach space   Let  be an absolutely convergent series in  As  is a Cauchy sequence of real numbers, for any  and large enough natural numbers  it holds:

By the triangle inequality for the norm , one immediately gets:

which means that  is a Cauchy sequence in  hence the series is convergent in

Rearrangements and unconditional convergence

Real and complex numbers

When a series of real or complex numbers is absolutely convergent, any rearrangement or reordering of that series' terms will still converge to the same value. This fact is one reason absolutely convergent series are useful: showing a series is absolutely convergent allows terms to be paired or rearranged in convenient ways without changing the sum's value.

The Riemann rearrangement theorem shows that the converse is also true: every real or complex-valued series whose terms cannot be reordered to give a different value is absolutely convergent.

Series with coefficients in more general space
The term unconditional convergence is used to refer to a series where any rearrangement of its terms still converges to the same value.

Stated more formally:

For series with more general coefficients, the converse is more complicated. As stated in the previous section, for real-valued and complex-valued series, unconditional convergence always implies absolute convergence. However, in the more general case of a series with values in any normed abelian group , the converse does not always hold: there can exist series which are not absolutely convergent, yet unconditionally convergent.

For example, in the Banach space ℓ∞, one series which is unconditionally convergent but not absolutely convergent is:

where  is an orthonormal basis.  A theorem of A. Dvoretzky and C. A. Rogers asserts that every infinite-dimensional Banach space has an unconditionally convergent series that is not absolutely convergent.

Proof of the theorem

For any  we can choose some  such that:

Let

where  so that  is the smallest natural number such that the list  includes all of the terms  (and possibly others).

Finally for any integer  let

so that 

and thus

This shows that

that is:

Q.E.D.

Products of series

The Cauchy product of two series converges to the product of the sums if at least one of the series converges absolutely.  That is, suppose that

The Cauchy product is defined as the sum of terms  where:

Absolute convergence over sets

A generalization of the absolute convergence of a series, is the absolute convergence of a sum of a function over a set.

First note that because no particular enumeration (or "indexing") of  has yet been specified, the series  cannot be understood by the more basic definition of a series.

Therefore we define  only in the case where there exists some bijection  such that  is absolutely convergent. Note that here, "absolutely convergent" uses the more basic definition, applied to an indexed series.

But first we define what it means for the sum to be convergent.

Let  be any set, countable or uncountable, and  a function.

Note that the final series uses the definition of a series over a countable set.

Absolute convergence of integrals

The integral  of a real or complex-valued function is said to converge absolutely if   One also says that  is absolutely integrable.  The issue of absolute integrability is intricate and depends on whether the Riemann, Lebesgue, or Kurzweil-Henstock (gauge) integral is considered; for the Riemann integral, it also depends on whether we only consider integrability in its proper sense ( and  both bounded), or permit the more general case of improper integrals.

As a standard property of the Riemann integral, when  is a bounded interval, every continuous function is bounded and (Riemann) integrable, and since  continuous implies  continuous, every continuous function is absolutely integrable. However, this implication does not hold in the case of improper integrals. For instance, the function  is improperly Riemann integrable on its unbounded domain, but it is not absolutely integrable:

Indeed, more generally, given any series  one can consider the associated step function  defined by   Then  converges absolutely, converges conditionally or diverges according to the corresponding behavior of 

The situation is different for the Lebesgue integral, which does not handle bounded and unbounded domains of integration separately (see below). In fact, in the Lebesgue theory of integration, given that  is measurable,  is (Lebesgue) integrable if and only if  is (Lebesgue) integrable.

On the other hand, a function  may be Kurzweil-Henstock integrable (gauge integrable) while  is not.  This includes the case of improperly Riemann integrable functions.

In a general sense, on any measure space  the Lebesgue integral of a real-valued function is defined in terms of its positive and negative parts, so the facts:

  integrable implies  integrable
  measurable,  integrable implies  integrable

are essentially built into the definition of the Lebesgue integral.  In particular, applying the theory to the counting measure on a set  one recovers the notion of unordered summation of series developed by Moore–Smith using (what are now called) nets.  When  is the set of natural numbers, Lebesgue integrability, unordered summability and absolute convergence all coincide.

Finally, all of the above holds for integrals with values in a Banach space.  The definition of a Banach-valued Riemann integral is an evident modification of the usual one.  For the Lebesgue integral one needs to circumvent the decomposition into positive and negative parts with Daniell's more functional analytic approach, obtaining the Bochner integral.

See also

Notes

References

Works cited

General references

  
 Walter Rudin, Principles of Mathematical Analysis (McGraw-Hill: New York, 1964).
  
  
  
  
  

Mathematical series
Integral calculus
Summability theory
Convergence (mathematics)